Being eaten alive may refer to the act of being consumed while still living, or more colloquially to the act of overwhelming someone. 

Eaten alive may also refer to:

Film
 Eaten Alive, a 1976 American horror film directed by Tobe Hooper
 Eaten Alive!, a 1980 Italian horror film directed by Umberto Lenzi
 Eaten Alive (TV program), a 2014 American television nature documentary

Food

San-nakji, Korean octopus dish sometimes eaten live
Drunken shrimp, Chinese shrimp dish sometimes eaten live
Ikizukuri, live sashimi
Odori ebi, Japanese live shrimp dish
Yin Yang fish, Chinese live fish dish
Eating live seafood or eating live animals in general

History
 Damnatio ad bestias, the Roman practice of execution by wild animals such as lions
 Scaphism, an alleged ancient Persian execution method where a victim would be eaten alive by insects

Music
 Eaten Alive (album), a 1985 album by American singer Diana Ross
 "Eaten Alive" (song), the title track off of Diana Ross' album
 Eaten Alive Tour, a series of performances by Diana Ross in support of the album of the same name
 The Eaten Alive Demos, a collection of demos for the Ross album by British-American musician Barry Gibb